Grandparents Plus is a national charity for England and Wales that supports and campaigns on behalf of the 200,000 grandparents, siblings, aunts, uncles, and other relatives who are raising children in Britain today because their parents cannot look after them.  This is often because of very difficult family circumstances, including parental death, disability, serious illness, substance use disorders, imprisonment or domestic violence. Relatives who are raising children from within the wider family are known as kinship carers.
The charity is funded by The Big Lottery to provide advice, information, and a peer support network for kinship carers.  
It publishes research and campaigns for improved support and recognition, both for kinship carers and for the millions of grandparents in the UK who provide childcare, arguing that both groups are undervalued economically.

History
The organisation was co-founded in 2001 by Michael Young, Baron Young of Dartington and the charity’s Co-Chair, Jean Stogdon OBE, a social services manager and Guardian Ad Litem.  It is based in The Young Foundation, Bethnal Green, London. The Chief Executive is Lucy Peake.

Reports
 "Grandparenting in Europe: Family Policy and Grandparents’ Role in Providing Childcare", March 2013 showed that British grandparents are almost twice as likely to be in paid work as their European counterparts and 6 in 10 are providing childcare for grandchildren. The report warns of a ‘care gap crisis’ unless action is taken.
 "Giving Up The Day Job", June 2012 showed that 47% of kinship carers who were previously working gave up their jobs when the children moved in      
 "Doing It All? Grandparents, Childcare and Employment: Analysis of British Social Attitudes Survey Data from 1998 and 2009" December 2011 showed that 63% of grandparents with grandchildren under 16 are providing childcare, with half (50%) of mothers relying on grandparents to look after their babies when they return from maternity leave.
 "Too Old To Care" 
 "What If We Said No?", Oct 2010 showed that 47% of kinship carers say the reason for taking on the care of a child is a parent struggling with a substance use disorder. 
 "Grandparenting in Europe", June 2010 showed that one in three working mothers depends on grandparents for childcare. 
 "Protect, support, provide – examining the role of grandparents in families at risk of poverty", March 2010  
 "Recognition, respect, reward", October 2009

References

External links
Grandparents Plus website

Charities based in England